Homona biscutata is a species of moth of the family Tortricidae. It is found in the Democratic Republic of Congo (Équateur) and Guinea.

References

Moths described in 1931
Homona (moth)
Taxa named by Edward Meyrick